Commidendrum is a genus of trees and shrubs in the family Asteraceae endemic to the island of Saint Helena in the South Atlantic Ocean. The vernacular name is gumwood or scrubwood.

 Species
 †Commidendrum burchellii (Hook.f.) Benth. & Hook.f. ex Hemsl.
 Commidendrum robustum (Roxb.) DC. (Saint Helena gumwood)
 Commidendrum rotundifolium (Roxb.) DC. (bastard gumwood)
 Commidendrum rugosum (Aiton) DC. (scrubwood)
 Commidendrum spurium (G. Forst.) DC. (false gumwood)

References

External links
 Global trees campaign: Saint Helena gumwood 

 
Asteraceae genera
Flora of Saint Helena